Jennifer Goodling (born April 26, 1962) is a former professional tennis player from the United States.

Biography

Early life
Goodling grew up in York, Pennsylvania, the daughter of a US congressman. Her grandfather George Atlee Goodling had also been a US congressman from Pennsylvania, before being succeeded by his son, Jennifer's father William F. Goodling, in 1975.

She went to both Dallastown Area High School and York Country Day School.

Tennis career
Goodling began her career on the WTA Tour in 1980 as an amateur and in the early 1980s attended Rollins College in Florida. In her All-American season at Rollins College in 1983, Goodling represented the United States at the University Games in Alberta.

After graduating from Rollins College in 1985, Goodling began touring professionally. At the 1988 Australian Open she featured in the singles main draw as a qualifier and made the round of 16 of the women's doubles. She was most successful in the doubles format, appearing in the women's doubles main draws of all four grand slam tournaments.

She still lives in Pennsylvania and is working as a tennis instructor.

References

External links
 
 

1962 births
Living people
American female tennis players
Tennis people from Pennsylvania
Sportspeople from York, Pennsylvania
Rollins Tars women's tennis players